Rumian or Rumyan may refer to:
 Rumian, Warmian-Masurian Voivodeship, a village in Poland
 Rumian railway station , in Punjab
 Rumyan Castle, in Iran
 Rumyan Hovsepyan, Armenian football player
 Rumyan Khristov, Bulgarian rower
 Rumiyan, the plural of the Persian demonym Rum